IsaDora cosmetics is a Swedish cosmetics brand established in 1983, located in Malmö. IsaDora's first beauty line appeared in Swedish stores in November 1983, and by 1984, IsaDora exported its products to Norway and the rest of Scandinavia. IsaDora has also expanded into the US market and was sold in Walgreens stores in the United States from 2003 until 2008. It is also sold in the United Kingdom. It was one of the sponsors and partners of the Eurovision Song Contest 2013. Part of the IsaDora assortment that appeared on posters as part of companies Eurovision campaign was "Big Bold Mascara", "Wonder Nail" and "Cream Mousse Eye Shadow". IsaDora also hosted their own Eurovision event with appearances from the participants of the contest.

In May 2013, IsaDora cosmetics launched its products in the UAE.

Isadora's products are not tested on animals.

References

External links
IsaDora official website

Swedish brands
Cosmetics brands
Companies based in Malmö